In enzymology, a capsular-polysaccharide-transporting ATPase is an enzyme that catalyzes the chemical reaction

ATP + H2O + capsular polysaccharidein  ADP + phosphate + capsular polysaccharideout

The 3 substrates of this enzyme are ATP, H2O, and capsular polysaccharide, whereas its 3 products are ADP, phosphate, and capsular polysaccharide.

This enzyme belongs to the family of hydrolases, specifically those acting on acid anhydrides to catalyse transmembrane movement of substances. The systematic name of this enzyme class is ATP phosphohydrolase (capsular-polysaccharide-exporting).

References

 
 
 
 
 

EC 7.6.2
Enzymes of unknown structure